Kandari is a census town in Jalgaon district in the Indian state of Maharashtra.

Kandari may also refer to:

People 
 Kandari tribe

Surname 
 Ali Al Kandari (born 1985), Kuwaiti footballer
 Anas Al Kandari (1981–2002)
 Matbar Singh Kandari

See also 
 Kandari Express, a Superfast train